Death Dances to a Reggae Beat is a novel written by Kate Grillery and published by Berkley Books on 1 June 2000 which later went on to win the Anthony Award for Best Paperback Original in 2001.

References 

2000 American novels
Berkley Books books
Anthony Award-winning works